While the word religion is difficult to define, one standard model of religion used in religious studies courses defines it as

Many religions have narratives, symbols, traditions and sacred histories that are intended to give meaning to life or to explain the origin of life or the universe. They tend to derive morality, ethics, religious laws, or a preferred lifestyle from their ideas about the cosmos and human nature. According to some estimates, there are roughly 4,200 religions, churches, denominations, religious bodies, faith groups, tribes, cultures, movements, ultimate concerns, which at some point in the future will be countless.

The word religion is sometimes used interchangeably with the words "faith" or "belief system", but religion differs from private belief in that it has a public aspect. Most religions have organized behaviours, including clerical hierarchies, a definition of what constitutes adherence or membership, congregations of laity, regular meetings or services for the purposes of veneration of a deity or for prayer, holy places (either natural or architectural) or religious texts. Certain religions also have a sacred language often used in liturgical services. The practice of a religion may also include sermons, commemoration of the activities of a God or gods, sacrifices, festivals, feasts, trance, rituals, liturgies, ceremonies, worship, initiations, funerals, marriages, meditation, invocation, mediumship, music, art, dance, public service, or other aspects of human culture. Religious beliefs have also been used to explain parapsychological phenomena such as out-of-body experiences, near-death experiences, and reincarnation, along with many other paranormal and supernatural experiences.

Some academics studying the subject have divided religions into three broad categories: world religions, a term which refers to transcultural, international faiths; Indigenous religions, which refers to smaller, culture-specific or nation-specific religious groups; and new religious movements, which refers to recently developed faiths. One modern academic theory of religion, social constructionism, says that religion is a modern concept that suggests all spiritual practice and worship follows a model similar to the Abrahamic religions as an orientation system that helps to interpret reality and define human beings, and thus believes that religion, as a concept, has been applied inappropriately to non-Western cultures that are not based upon such systems, or in which these systems are a substantially simpler construct.

Eastern religions

Dharmic religions 

The four main religions that originated in the Indian subcontinent; namely Hinduism, Jainism, Sikhism and Buddhism and religions and traditions related to, and descended from them.

Buddhism 

Pre-sectarian Buddhism (theorized)
Mahayana
Chinese Buddhism
Tiantai
Tendai
Cheontae
Huayan school
Daśabhūmikā
Chan Buddhism
Seon Buddhism
Thiền Buddhism
Trúc Lâm (syncretic)
Zen Buddhism
Caodong school
Sōtō
Keizan line
Jakuen line
Giin line
Linji school
Otokan line
Rinzai
Ōbaku
Fuke-shū
Sanbo Kyodan
Madhyamaka
Sanlun
Jonang
Prasaṅgika
Svatantrika
Nichiren Buddhism
Honmon Butsuryū-shū
Kempon Hokke
Nichiren Shōshū
Nichiren Shū
Pure Land Buddhism
Jōdo Shinshū
Honganji-ha
Ōtani-ha
Yuzu Nembutsu
Seizan
Jōdo-shū
Yogācāra
East Asian Yogācāra
Nikaya Buddhism (incorrectly called "Hinayana" in the West)
Theravada
Sangharaj Nikaya
Mahasthabir Nikaya
Dwara Nikaya
Shwegyin Nikaya
Thudhamma Nikaya 
Amarapura–Rāmañña Nikāya
Galduwa Forest Tradition
Siam Nikaya
Sri Lankan Forest Tradition
Dhammayuttika Nikaya
Thai Forest Tradition
Maha Nikaya (Thailand)
Dhammakaya Movement
Vipassana movement (United States)
Vajrayana
Azhaliism
Bongthingism
Chinese Esoteric Buddhism
Newar Buddhism
Indonesian Esoteric Buddhism
Shingon Buddhism
Southern Esoteric Buddhism
Tibetan Buddhism
Bon (syncretic)
Gelug
Kagyu
Dagpo Kagyu
Karma Kagyu
Drukpa Kagyu
Shangpa Kagyu
Nyingma
Sakya
Jonang
Bodongpa

Dharmic philosophy schools 

Āstika (Orthodox schools)
Nyaya
Mimamsa
Samkhya
Vaisheshika
Vedanta
Advaita Vedanta
Akshar-Purushottam Darshan
Bhedabheda
Achintya Bheda Abheda
Dvaitadvaita
Dvaita Vedanta
Pratyabhijna
Shaiva Siddhanta
Shiva Advaita
Shuddhadvaita
Vishishtadvaita
Yoga (philosophy)
Nāstika (Heterodox schools)
Ajivika
Ajñana
Akiriya
Buddhism
Charvaka
Jainism
Sassatavada

Hinduism 

Sant Mat
Dadupanth 
Kabir panth
Ravidassia religion
Sadh
Shaivism
Aghori
Kapalika
Kashmir Shaivism
Kaumaram
Nath
 Adinath Sampradaya
 Inchegeri Sampradaya
Pashupata Shaivism
Shaiva Siddhanta
Veerashaivism 
Lingayatism
Shaktism
Srikula
Smartism
Śrauta
Tantra
Kaula
Vaishnavism/Krishnaism
Balmikism
Bhagavata tradition
Brahma Sampradaya
Madhva tradition
Gaudiya Vaishnavism
Manipuri Vaishnavism
Haridasa
Ekasarana Dharma
Kapadi Sampradaya
Mahanubhava
Nimbarka Sampradaya
Pranami/Pranami Sampraday
Radha Vallabh Sampradaya
Ramsnehi Sampradaya
Rudra Sampradaya
Pushtimarg
Sri Vaishnavism
Ramanandi Sampradaya
Thenkalais
Manavala Mamunigal Sabha 
Vaishnava-Sahajiya
Warkari
Syncretic Hinduism

 Banjara hinduism
 Baul
Bhil hinduism
 Dyaoism
 Indonesian hinduism
 Balinese hinduism
 Javanese hinduism
 Tenggerese hinduism
 Naurus
 Nuaulu religion

Jainism 

Digambara
Kanji Panth
Taran Panth
Śvētāmbara
Murtipujaka
Sthānakavāsī

Sikhism 

Khalsa
Nanakpanthi
Nirmala
Sanatan Sikh
Udasi

Yoga 

Ananda Yoga
Bhakti yoga
Hatha yoga
Bihar School of Yoga
Integral Yoga
Jivamukti Yoga
Jnana yoga
Karma yoga
Kripalu Yoga
Kriya Yoga
Kundalini yoga
Raja yoga
Sahaja Yoga
Siddha Yoga
Sivananda yoga
Surat Shabd Yoga
Tantric Yoga

East Asian religions 

Religions that originated in East Asia, also known as Taoic religions; namely Taoism, Confucianism, Muism and Shinto, and religions and traditions related to, and descended from them.

Chinese folk religion 

 Ancestor Worship
 Benzhuism
 Chinese folk religion in Southeast Asia
 Faism
 Kam religion
 Maonan traditional religion
 Mazu worship
 Mo religion
 Northeast China folk religion
 Nuo folk religion 
 Qiang folk religion 
 Queen Mother worship 
 Shangdiism 
 Shenism 
 Sui religion 
 Then 
 Wang Ye worship
 Wuism

Chinese philosophy schools 

Taojia ("School of the Tao")
Fajia ('School of Law")
Zonghengjia ("School of Diplomacy")
Huang–Lao
Mojia ("School of Mo")
Mingjia ("School of Names")
Nongjia ("School of Agrarianism")
Ruijia ("School of Scholars")
Yangism
Yinyangjia ("School of Yin Yang")
Zajia ("School of Syncretism")

Confucianism 

Confucian ritual religion
Han Learning
Korean Confucianism
Donghak
Lingnan Confucianism
 Neo-Confucianism
 Yangmingism
 Edo Neo-Confucianism
 New Confucianism
 New Text
 Old Text
 Progressive Confucianism

Japonic religions 

Shinto
Izumo-taishakyo
Koshintō (Historical)
Shinbutsu-shugo
Konkōkyō
Shugendō
State Shinto
Yoshida Shintō
Matagi spirituality
Ryukyuan religion

Koreanic religions 

Muism
Gasin faith

Taoism 

Korean Taoism
Quanzhen School ("School of the Fulfilled Virtue")
Shangqing School ("School of the Highest Clarity")
Vietnamese Taoism
Way of the Five Pecks of Rice
Way of the Celestial Masters
Lijiadao ("Way of the Li Family") (Historical)
Way of the Northern Celestial Masters (Historical)
Zhengyi Dao ("Way of the Right Oneness")
Way of the Taiping (Historical)
Syncretic Taoism
Chongxuan School
Dragon Gate Taoism
Kōshin
Lingbao School ("School of the Numinous Treasure")
Wuliupai ("School of Wu-Liu")
Xuanxue ("Neo-Taoism")
Yao Taoism ("Meishanism")

Vietnamese religions 

 Dao Luong
 Đạo Mẫu
 Muong ethnic religion
 Ta Oi animism

Middle Eastern religions 

Religions that originated in the Middle East; namely Zoroastrianism, Judaism, Christianity, and Islam, and religions and traditions related to, and descended from them.

Abrahamic religions

Christianity 

Early Christianity
 Arianism
Gnosticism
Bogomilism 
Catharism
Cerdonians
Ecclesia Gnostica
Johannite Church 
Paulicianism
Sethianism
Basilideans
Valentinianism
Bardesanite School
Simonians
Marcionism
Nicene Christianity
Eastern Christianity

Church of the East (called "Nestorianism")
Ancient Church of the East
Assyrian Church of the East
Chaldean Syrian Church
Chaldean Catholic Church
Eastern Catholic Churches
Albanian Greek Catholic Church
Belarusian Greek Catholic Church
Bulgarian Greek Catholic Church
Byzantine Catholic Church of Croatia and Serbia
Greek Byzantine Catholic Church
Hungarian Byzantine Catholic Church
Italo-Albanian Catholic Church (a.k.a. the "Italo-Greek Catholic Church")
Macedonian Catholic Church
Melkite Greek Catholic Church
Romanian Catholic Church
Russian Greek Catholic Church
Ruthenian Greek Catholic Church (a.k.a. the "Byzantine Catholic Church" in the United States)
Slovak Greek Catholic Church
Ukrainian Greek Catholic Church
Chaldean Catholic Church
Syriac Catholic Church
Maronite Church
Syro-Malankara Catholic Church
Syro-Malabar Catholic Church
(Independent Eastern Catholic Churches)
Ukrainian Orthodox Greek Catholic Church
Eastern Orthodox Church (officially the "Orthodox Catholic Church")
Greek Orthodox Church
Serbian Orthodox Church
Russian Orthodox Church
Belarusian Orthodox Church
Romanian Orthodox Church
Bulgarian Orthodox Church
Georgian Orthodox Church
Albanian Orthodox Church
Ukrainian Orthodox Church
(Noncanonical/Independent Eastern Orthodox Churches)
Old Calendarists (a.k.a. "Genuine Orthodox" or "True Orthodox")
Russian Old Believers (a.k.a. "Old Ritualists")
Bezpopovtsy
Popovtsy
Oriental Orthodox Churches (a.k.a. "Non-Chalcedonian" or "Miaphysite"/"Monophysite")
Armenian Apostolic Church
Coptic Orthodox Church
Syriac Orthodox Church
Malankara Jacobite Syrian Church (of the St. Thomas Christians in India)
Ethiopian Orthodox Church
Eritrean Orthodox Church 
Malankara Orthodox Syrian Church (of the St. Thomas Christians in India)
Hesychasmism
Palamism 
Spiritual Christianity
Doukhobor
Khlyst
Molokan
Skoptsy
Western Christianity
Proto-Protestantism
Brethren of the Free Spirit (Historical)
Hussites (Historical)
Czech Brethren
Moravians
Lollardy (Historical)
Strigolniki (Historical)
Waldensians
Protestantism
Anabaptists (Radical Protestants)
Amish
Hutterites
Mennonites
River Brethren
Schwarzenau Brethren
Shakers
Anglicanism
Anglo-Catholicism
Anglican Papalism
Broad church
Continuing Anglican movement
English Dissenters
Evangelical Anglicanism
Nonconformists
Puritans
Fifth Monarchists
Radical orthodoxy
Baptists
General Baptists
Free Will Baptists
Landmarkism
Missionary Baptists
Primitive Baptists
Strict Baptists
Reformed Baptists
Black church
Black theology
Christian deism
Confessing Movement
Evangelicalism
Charismatic movement
Emerging church
German Christians (movement)
Neo-charismatic movement
Neo-Evangelicalism
New Apostolic Reformation
Plymouth Brethren
Exclusive Brethren
Open Brethren
Progressive Christianity
Protestant fundamentalism
Jesuism
Lutheranism
Evangelical Catholic
Laestadianism
Neo-Lutheranism
Pietism
Methodism
Calvinistic Methodists
Holiness movement
Church of the Nazarene
The Salvation Army
Wesleyanism
Pentecostalism
Church of God
Latter Rain movement
Oneness Pentecostalism
Word of Faith
Quakers ("Friends")
Reformed churches
Amyraldism (a.k.a."four-point Calvinism")
Arminianism
Remonstrants
Christian reconstructionism
Congregational churches
Continental Reformed churches
Swiss Reformed
Dutch Reformed
French Huguenot
Neo-Calvinism
New Calvinism
Presbyterianism
Zwinglianism (Historical)
Reformed Eastern Christianity
Restoration movement
Adventism
Seventh-day Adventist Church
Christadelphians
Churches of Christ
Cooneyites
Iglesia ni Cristo
Bible Student movement
Jehovah's Witnesses
Free Bible Students
Friends of Man
Latter Day Saint movement
The Church of Jesus Christ of Latter-day Saints
Community of Christ
Mormon fundamentalism
Millerism (Historical)
Stone-Campbell movement (a.k.a. "Campbellites")
Two by Twos (a.k.a. "No name church" and "Workers and Friends")
Swedenborgianism (a.k.a. "The New Church")
Unitarianism
Roman Catholic Church/Latin Church (a.k.a. "Roman Catholicism" or "Catholicism")
Anglican Ordinariate Catholics
Charismatic Catholics
Civil Constitution of the Clergy
Gallicanism
Hebrew Catholics
Independent Catholic churches
Old Catholic Church (Union of Utrecht)
Polish National Catholic Church (Union of Scranton)
Liberal Catholicism
Liberation theology
Modernist Catholics
Traditionalist Catholics
Sedevacantism
Palmarian Catholic Church
Sedeprivationism
Ultramontanism
Syncretic
 Aymara spirituality
 Bagnolians (Historical)
 Esoteric Christianity
Martinism
 Christian Theosophy
 Christopaganism
Christian Wicca
God Worshipping Society (Historical)
Judaizers (Judeo-Christian)
Christian Kabbalah
Hebrew Roots
Makuya
Messianic Judaism
Sacred Name Movement
Subbotniks
Yehowists
Lisu
Raramuri religion
Xueta
Yaqui religion
Other
American Civil Religion
Bosnian Church (Historical)
Christian Universalism
Nondenominational Christianity
Nontrinitarianism
Tolstoyan movement

Islam 

Khawarij

Azraqi (Historical)
Haruriyyah (Historical)
Ibadi
Sufri (Historical)
Shia Islam
Alevism
Alians
Bektashism
Kurdish Alevism
Alawites (Nusayris)
Isma'ilism
Mustaali
Dawoodi Bohra
Alavi Bohra
Atba-i-Malak
Atba-i-Malak Badar
Atba-i-Malak Vakil
Hebtiahs Bohra
Progressive Dawoodi Bohra
Sulaymani
Nizari
Twelver
Ja'fari jurisprudence
Akhbari
Shaykhism
Usuli
Zaidiyyah
Jarudiyah
Batriyya
Khurramites (Historical)
Sufism

Bektashi Order
Chishti Order
Kubrawiya
Khufiyya
Mevlevi Order
Mouride
Naqshbandi
Jahriyya
Ni'matullāhī
Qadiriyya
Roshani
Shadhili
Suhrawardiyya
Sufi Order International
Tijaniyyah
Universal Sufism
Sunni Islam

Kalam/Fiqh
Ash'ari
Maliki
Shafi'i 
Hanbali
Maturidi
Hanafi
Barelvi
Deobandi
Gedimu
Athari
Salafi
Madkhalism
Wahhabism
Ahle Hadith
Islamism
Islamic Modernism
Muʿtazila
Satpanth
Syncretic
 Ali-Illahism
 Din-i Ilahi
 Kafirism
 Wetu Telu
Other
Ahmadiyya
European Islam
Jadid
Liberal movements within Islam
Mahdavia
Mahdist movement
Quranism
Riaz Ahmed Gohar Shahi
Messiah Foundation International

Judaism 
KabbalahNon-Rabbinic Judaism
 Haymanot
 Karaite Judaism
 Qemant Judaism
 Samaritanism
Rabbinic Judaism

 Conservative Judaism ( Masorti Judaism)
 Humanistic Judaism
 Jewish Renewal
 Orthodox Judaism
 Haredi Judaism (a.k.a. ultra-Orthodox)
 Dor Daim
 Hardal
 Hasidic Judaism
 Misnagdim
 Sephardic Haredi
 Modern Orthodox Judaism
 Religious Zionism
 Reconstructionist Judaism
 Reform Judaism
Historical Judaism
 Essenes
 Bana'im
 Hemerobaptists (possible ancestor of Mandaeism) (Historical)
 Maghāriya
 Nasoraeans (possible ancestor of Mandaeism) (Historical)
 Hypsistarianism (Historical)
 Pharisees (ancestor of Rabbinic Judaism) (Historical)
 Sadducees (possible ancestor of Karaite Judaism) (Historical)
 Zealots (Judea)
 Sicarii
 Messianic sects
 Ebionites
 Elcesaites
 Nazarenes
 Sabbateans
 Second Temple Judaism
 Frankism

Other Abrahamic 
Babism
Azali
Baha'i faith
Caravan of East and West
Free Baha'is
Orthodox Baha'i Faith
 Druze
 Mandaeism
 Milah Abraham

Iranian religions

Manichaeism 

 Athinganoi (Historical)
 Chinese Manichaeism

Yazdânism 

Ishikism
Shabakism
Yarsanism
Yazidi

Zoroastrianism 

Behafaridians (Historical)
Mazdakism (Historical)
Mazdaznan
Zurvanism (Historical)

Indigenous (ethnic, folk) religions 

Religions that consist of the traditional customs and beliefs of particular ethnic groups, refined and expanded upon for thousands of years, often lacking formal doctrine. Some adherents do not consider their ways to be "religion," preferring other cultural terms.

African

Traditional African 

 ǃKung religion
 Abwoi religion
 Acholi religion
 Afizere traditional religion
 Akan religion
 Asante religion
 Azande traditional religion
 Bafia religion
 Baka traditional religion
 Bantu religion
 Abagusii religion
 Akamba traditional religion
 AmaMpondomise traditional religion
 Badimo
 Balondo religion
 Baluba religion
 Bamileke religion
 Bamum traditional religion
 Banyole traditional beliefs
 Bubi spirituality
 Bushongo religion
 Bwiti
 Chaga faith
 Chokwe spiritual beliefs
 Duala traditional religion
 Fipa religion
 Furiiru traditional religion
 Giriama traditional religion
 Herero traditional faith
 Himba religion
 Kikuyu traditional religion
 Kongo religion
 Kwe faith
 Lozi religion
 Luvale religion
 Makua traditional religion
 Mbole religion
 Nyakyusa religion
 Ovambo traditional religion
 Pedi traditional religion
 Songye religion
 Suku religion
 Swazi traditional religion
 Tonga religion
 Tsonga traditional religion
 Tumbuka religion
 Xhosa traditional religion
 Zulu traditional religion
 Baoule traditional religion
 Bari traditional religion
 Bassa traditional religion
 Biri traditional religion
 Bobo religion
 Bori
 Bwa religion
 Chamba traditional religion
 Dahomean religion
 Damara religion
 Dan religion
 Dinka religion
 Dogon religion
 Ebira traditional religion
 Edo traditional religion
 Efik religion
 Ekoi religion
 Esan traditional religion
 Fali traditional religion
 Frafra beliefs
 Gbagyi traditional religion
 Hadza religion
 Hyel
 Idoma traditional religion
 Ijaw traditional religion
 Inam
 Jola traditional religion
 Asisian religion
 Khoekhoen religion
 Kissi traditional religion
 Kono traditional religion
 Koore religion
 Krahn religion
 Kuku traditional beliefs
 Lobi animism
 Lotuko ethnic religion
 Lugbara religion
 Maasai religion
 Madi traditional religion
 Manjak religion
 Mbuti religion
 Moba ethnic religion
 Mursi animism
 Nso religion
 Nuer religion
 Nyongo Society
 Bakossi beliefs
 Odinala / Odinani
 Oropom religion
 Safwa religion
 Samburu religion
 San religion
 Serer religion
 Sidama religion
 Surma religion
 Tammari traditional religion
 Temne traditional religion
 Traditional Berber religion
 Turkana traditional religion
 Urhobo traditional religion
 Vodun
 Waaqeffanna
 Yoruba religion
 Ifá
Indigenous religion in Zimbabwe
Shona traditional religion

Diasporic African 

 Abakuá
 Arara religion 
 Candomblé
 Candomblé Bantu
 Candomblé Jejé
 Candomblé Ketu
 Comfa
 Convince
 Cuban Vodú
 Dominican Vudú
 Espiritismo
 Haitian Vodou
 Hoodoo
 Kélé
 Kumina
 Louisiana Voodoo
 Montamentu
 Myal
 Obeah
 Palo
 Quimbanda
 Santería
 Tambor de Mina
 Trinidad Orisha
 Umbanda
 Winti
 Saramaka religion

Altaic 

 Evenki shamanism
 Manchu shamanism
 Turko-Mongolic religion
Altaic shamanism
Burkhanism
 Dukha shamanism
Mongolian shamanism
 Tengrism
 Aiyy
 Tengir Ordo
 Vattisen Yaly
 Nanai shamanism
Oroqen shamanism
Shor shamanism
Soyot shamanism
Ulch shamanism
Yakut Shamanism

American 

 Ache traditional tribal religion
 Achuar religious beliefs
 Acoma traditional religion
 Aguaruna traditional beliefs
 Akawaio religion
 Alaska Native religion
 Inuit religion
 Tanana shamanism
 Yupik shamanism
 Yuit shamanism
 Sirenik shamanism
 Ancestral Pueblo religion (Basketmaker III) (Pueblo II) (Pueblo III) (Pueblo IV)
 Andoque religion
 Anishinaabe traditional beliefs
 Ojibwe spirituality
 Apache traditional tribal religion
 Arhuaco spirituality
 Atacama religious culture
 Blackfoot religion
 Bororo totemism
 Caddo religion
 Californian traditional religions
 Achomawi religion
 Acjachemen religion
 Kuksu
 Cahto religion
 Esselen spirituality
 Miwok religion
 Ohlone spirituality
 Pomo religion
 Northern Paiute shamanism
 Mohave religion
 Wiyot spirituality
 Calusa native religion
 Chaná religion
 Cherokee spiritual beliefs
 Choctaw religion
 Creek religion
 Croatan religious beliefs
 Crow religion
 Fuegian spirituality
 Selk'nam religion
 Garifuna spirituality
 Guarani religion
 Guarayos traditional religious beliefs
 Guayupe traditional religion
 Gwich'in traditional beliefs
 Haida religion
 Ho-Chunk religion
 Hopi religion
 Huaorani traditional animism
 Hupda cosmgony
 Incan religion
 Chauvin religion
 Nazca religious beliefs
 Wari' beliefs
 Illinois religion
 Innu religion
 Iroquois religion
 Mohawk traditional religion
 Seneca religion
 Wyandot religion
 Jivaroan religion
 Karankawa indigenous religion
 Kayabi traditional tribal religion
 Kalapalo beliefs
Kalinago religion
 Kogi traditional religion
 Kuikoro religion
 Kwakwakaʼwakw religion
 Lakota religion
 Lenape religion
 Lokono animist spirituality
 Maleku animism
 Mandan religion
 Mapuche religion
 Marajoara religion
 Matses animism
 Mesoamerican religion 
 Aztec religion
 Cora religion
 Huichol traditional religion
 Maya religion
 Chuj traditional beliefs
 Huastec religion
 Lacandon traditional beliefs
 Mazatec traditional religion
 Mopan traditional religion
 Pech traditional religion
 Q'eqchi' religion
 Tzeltal religion
 Tzotzil native religion
 Tzʼutujil traditional religion
 Mixe religion
 Nagualism
 Olmec religion
 Purépecha religion
 Teotihuacan religion
 Tepehuan religious beliefs
 Tlapanec religion
 Totonac traditional religion
 Zapotec religion
 Midewiwin
 Abenaki religious beliefs
Mi'kmaq traditional religion
 Old Miskito religion
Muisca religion
 Muzo traditional religion
 Navajo spirituality
 Nuu-chah-nulth religion
 Omaha religion
 Osage traditional spirituality
 Pawnee religion
 Parakanã shamanism
 Pech traditional religion
 Pemon traditional tribal religion
 Penobscot spirituality
 Pericues religion
 Piaroa traditional religion
 Powhatan native religion
 Puruhá traditional religion
 Q'ero spirituality
 Quechua traditional beliefs
 Rikbaktsa traditional beliefs
 Salish narratives
 Seminole traditional native religion
 Seri religion
 Shuar shamanism
 Southeastern Ceremonial Complex (religion of the Mississippian culture)
 Taensa native tribal religion
 Taino spirituality
 Tairona religion
 Talamancan religion
 Tapirape shamanism
 Tehuelche beliefs
 Ticuna shamanism
 Toba belief system
 Tlingit religion
 Tsimshian religion
 Ute religion
 Wai-Wai religion
 Wapishana religion
 Warao traditional beliefs
 Wayuu religion
 Yaruro traditional tribal religion
 Zuni religion

Austroasiatic 
 Asur religion
 Birhor traditional religion
 Bru religion
 Ka Niam Khasi
 Nicobarese traditional religion
 Ka Niamtre
 Paoch animism
 Santal religion
 Sarnaism
 Senoi ethnic religion
 Sora traditional beliefs
 Tampuan animism

Austronesian 
 Amis native religion
 Aliran Kepercayaan/Mythology of Indonesia
 Adat Pu'un
 Aluk
 Batak Parmalim
 Dayak religion
 Kaharingan
 Jingi Tiu
 Kejawèn
 Kapitayan 
 Kangeanese religion
 Karo Pemena
 Kendayan religion
 Marapu
 Rejang religion
 Rotenese religion
 Saminism Movement
 Sangirese religion
 Sumbawa religion
 Sundanese Wiwitan
 Wai Apu religion
Dayawism
 Batak folk religion
 Bicolano religion
 Blaan folk religion
 Capiznon folk religion
 Cuyunon folk religion
 Gaddang folk religion
 Ifugao folk religion
 Ilocano folk religion
 Itneg folk religion
 Kalinga folk religion
 Kankanaey folk religion
 Karay-a folk religion
 Mangyan folk religion
 Palawan folk religion
 Pangasinan folk religion
 Sama Bajau folk religion
 Sambal folk religion
 Subanon folk religion
 Tagalog folk religion
 Tagbanwa folk religion
 Tboli folk religion
 Teduray folk religion
 Visayan folk religion
 Fomba Gasy
 Jarai religion
 Kanakanavu native religion
 Malaysian folk religion
 Datuk Keramat
 Jakun religion
 Pengarap Iban
 Melanau religion
 Momolianism
 Murut religion
 Orang Kanaq religion
 Orang Seletar religion
 Semai religion
 Semaq Beri religion
 Temuan religion
 Micronesian religion
 Carolinian religion
 Chamorro religion
 Chuukese religion
 Nauruan indigenous religion
 Polynesian narrative
 Cook Islands narrative
 Hawaiian religion
 Mangarevan narrative
 Māori religion
 Rapa Nui narrative
 Samoan narrative
 Tahitian narrative
 Tongan narrative
 Tuvaluan narrative
 Paiwan shamanism
 Sakizaya native religion
 Taivoan animism
 Tao native religion

Caucasian 
 Khabzeism
 Vainakh religion

Dravidian 

 Khond traditional religion
 Koyapunem
 Sauria Paharia religion
 Tamil religion
 Toda religion

Indo-European 
 Kalashism
 Nagpuria religion
 Ossetian native religion
 Tharu religion

Melanesian and Aboriginal 

 Australian Aboriginal spirituality
 Gamilaraay dreaming
 Larrakia dreaming
 Tasmanian Aboriginal spirituality
Fijian ancient religion
Kanak traditional beliefs
Papuan religion
 Dumo spirituality
 Fore traditional beliefs
 Kaluli religion
 Korowai religion
 Trobriand traditional beliefs
 Urapmin traditional beliefs

Negrito 
 Aeta religion
 Ati animism
 Onge native religion
 Semang animism
 Vedda original religion

Paleosiberian 

 Ainu religion
 Koryak religion
 Itelmen religion
 Nivkh traditional religion
 Yukaghir shamanism

Sino-Tibetan 
 Banrawat religion
 Bathouism
 Biate animism
 Bimoism
 Bon
 Dongba
 Hangui
 Burmese folk religion
 Chang Naga animism
 Chutia religion
 Daba
 Dingba
 Donyi-Polo
 Sangsarek
 Gurung shamanism
 Hani religion
 Hnam Sakhua
 Kan Khwan
 Karbi animism
 Karen animism
 Lisu religion
 Jingpo religion
 Kiratism
 Maring beliefs
 Miji animism
 Mizo religion
 Nyezi-No
 Reang religion
 Sanamahism
 Tangsa Naga animism
 Toto nature religion
 Zahv

Tai and Miao 
 Hlai animism
 Kev Dab Kev Qhuas
 Pa Then religion
 Qabiao religion
 Satsana Phi
 Ahom religion
 Giay animism
 Lamet religion
 Nung religion
 Saek religion

Uralic 
 Komi shamanism
 Mari Native Religion

New religious movements 

Religions that cannot be classed as either world religions or traditional folk religions, and are usually recent in their inception.

Cargo cults 

John Frum
Johnson cult
Prince Philip Movement
Vailala Madness

New ethnic religions

Black 

African Zionism
Ausar Auset Society
Black Muslims
American Society of Muslims
Dini Ya Msambwa
Five-Percent Nation
Godianism
Igbe religion
Moorish Science Temple of America
Moorish Orthodox Church of America
Mumboism
Nation of Islam
United Nation of Islam
Nuwaubian Nation
Black Hebrew Israelites
African Hebrew Israelites of Jerusalem
Church of God and Saints of Christ
Commandment Keepers
Israelite Church of God in Jesus Christ
Israelite School of Universal Practical Knowledge
Nation of Yahweh
One West Camp
Rastafari

 Bobo Ashanti
 Nyabinghi
 Twelve Tribes of Israel

White 

Ariosophy
British Israelism
Christian Identity
Creativity
French Israelism
Nordic Israelism
Wotansvolk

Native American 

Ghost Dance
Indian Shaker Church
Longhouse Religion
Mexicayotl
peyote meetings
Wasshat religion

World Religion-derived new religions

Abrahamic-derived 
Antoinism
Branch Davidians
Chrislam
Eastern Lightning
 Mama Tada
Modekngei
Noahidism
Pai Marire
Pilgrims of Ares
Rātana
Ringatu
The Family International
World Elijah Evangelical Mission

Chinese salvationist religions 

 Baguadao ("Way of the Eight Trigrams")
 Dejiao ("Teaching of Virtue")
 Huangjidao ("Way of the Imperial Pole")
 Huangtiandao ("Way of the Yellow Sky")
 Huazhaidao ("Way of Flowers and Fasting")
 Jiugongdao ("Way of the Nine Palaces")
 Luandao ("Phoenix Way")
 Luoism ("Way of Luo")
 Chinese religions of fasting
 Xiantiandao ("Way of Former Heaven")
 Guiyidao ("Way of the Return to the One")
 Shengdao ("Holy Way")
 Yaochidao ("Way of the Mother of Pearl Lake")
 Yiguandao ("Persistent Way")
 Haizidao
 Yixin Tiandao ("Heart-bound Heavenly Way")
 Dacheng
 Hongyangism
 Maitreyanism
 Sanyiism
 Shanrendao ("Way of the Virtuous Man")
 Taigu school
 Tiandihui (Historical)
 Tiandiism
 Tianguangdao ("Way of the Heavenly Light")
 Tianxian Miaodao ("Way of the Temple of the Heavenly Immortals")
 Weixinism
 White Lotus
 Xuanyuandao ("Way of Xuanyuan")
 Yellow Sand Society
 Zailiism ("Way of the Abiding Principle)
 Zhongyongdao ("Way of the Golden Mean")

Hindu reform movements 

Adidam
Adi Dharm
Brahmoism 
Brahmo Samaj
Sadharan Brahmo Samaj
Ananda
Ananda Ashrama
Ananda Marga
Arya Samaj
Ayyavazhi
Chinmaya Mission
Hare Krishna
Mahanam Sampraday
Mahima Dharma
Matua Mahasangha
Oneness Movement
Rajneesh movement
Satsang
Shirdi Sai Baba movement
Sivananda Yoga Vedanta Centres
Sri Aurobindo Ashram
Sri Ramana Ashram
Neo-Advaita
Swaminarayan Sampradaya
Bochasanwasi Akshar Purushottam Swaminarayan Sanstha
Laxmi Narayan Dev Gadi
International Swaminarayan Satsang Mandal
Swaminarayan Gurukul
Nar Narayan Dev Gadi
International Swaminarayan Satsang Organisation
Narnarayan Dev Yuvak Mandal
Swaminarayan Gadi (Maninagar)
Swaminarayan Mandir Vasna Sanstha
Transcendental Meditation

Muist-derived 

Cheondoism
Jeungsanism
Daesun Jinrihoe
Jeung San Do
Bocheonism
Suwunism
Daejongism

Neo-Buddhism 

Đạo Bửu Sơn Kỳ Hương
 Hòa Hảo
Diamond Way Buddhism
Falun Gong
Humanistic Buddhism
Navayana
New Kadampa Tradition
Nipponzan-Myōhōji-Daisanga
PL Kyodan
Reiyūkai
Risshō Kōsei Kai
Rimé movement
Shambhala Buddhism
Shinnyo-en
Soka Gakkai
Triratna Buddhist Community
 True Buddha School
Won Buddhism

Perennial and interfaith 
 Anandamayee Sangha
 Bell religion
 Brahma Kumaris
Caodaism
Đạo Dừa
Meivazhi
Omnism
Open-source religion
Satya Dharma
Sathya Sai Baba movement
 Share International
 Subud

Shinshukyo 

Aum Shinrikyo
Aleph
Hikari no Wa
Happy Science
Ijun
Konkokyo
Kurozumikyō
Oomoto
Church of World Messianity
Mahikari
Seicho-no-Ie
Shōroku Shintō Yamatoyama
Shumei
Sekai Shindokyo
Shinmeiaishinkai
Tenrikyo
Tenshō Kōtai Jingūkyō
Zenrinkyo

Sikh-derived 
 Contemporary Sant Mat movements
 Advait Mat
 Radha Soami
 Radha Soami Satsang Beas
 Radha Soami Satsang Dayagbal
 Radha Swami Satsang, Dinod
 Ruhani Satsang
 Manavta Mandir
 Science of Spirituality (a.k.a. Sawan Kirpal Ruhani Mission)
 Radha Soami-influenced
 Ancient Teachings of the Masters
 Dera Sacha Sauda
 Eckankar
 Elan Vital (formerly Divine Light Mission)
 Movement of Spiritual Inner Awareness
 Ravidassia

Modern paganism

Ethnic neopaganism 

Hetanism
Baltic neopaganism
Dievturība
Romuva
Caucasian neopaganism
Abkhaz neopaganism
Assianism
Celtic neopaganism
Celtic reconstructionist paganism
Druidry
Heathenry (a.k.a. Germanic neopaganism)
Hellenism
Heraka
Italo-Roman neopaganism
Nova Roma
Roman Traditional Movement
Kemetism
Kemetic Orthodoxy
Semitic neopaganism
Rodnovery (a.k.a. Slavic neopaganism)
Native Polish Church
Peterburgian Vedism
Rodzima Wiara
Rodnover Confederation
RUNVira (a.k.a. Sylenkoism)
Union of Slavic Native Belief Communities
Ynglism
Uralic neopaganism
Estonian neopaganism
Suomenusko
Hungarian neopaganism
Mastorava
Udmurt Vos
Zalmoxianism
Zuism

Syncretic neopaganism 

Adonism
Christopaganism
Christian Wicca
Church of All Worlds
Church of Aphrodite
Cochrane's Craft
Druidry
Ár nDraíocht Féin
Order of Bards, Ovates, and Druids
Reformed Druids of North America
Feraferia
Goddess movement
Huna
Ivanovism
Krama
Neoshamanism
Pow-wow
Radical Faeries
Ringing Cedars' Anastasianism
Santa Muerte
Stregheria
Summum
Technopaganism
Wicca
British Traditional Wicca
Gardnerian Wicca
Alexandrian Wicca
Central Valley Wicca
Algard Wicca
Chthonioi Alexandrian Wicca
Blue Star Wicca
Seax-Wica
Universal Eclectic Wicca
Celtic Wicca
Dianic Wicca
Faery Wicca
Feri Tradition
Georgian Wicca
Odyssean Wicca
Wiccan church
Covenant of the Goddess

Entheogenic religions

Church of the Universe
Neo-American Church
Santo Daime
Temple of the True Inner Light
Tensegrity
THC Ministry
União do Vegetal

New Age Movement 

 A Course in Miracles
 Association for Research and Enlightenment
 Chaos Magic
 Conversations with God
 Eckankar
 Love Has Won
 Rainbow Family
 The Family

New Thought 

 Christian Science
 Church of Divine Science
 Church of the Truth
 Church Universal and Triumphant
 Home of Truth
 Jewish Science
 Psychiana
 Religious Science
 Seicho-no-Ie
 The Infinite Way
 Unity Church
 Universal Foundation for Better Living
 Council of Cosmic Existence

Parody religions and fiction-based religions 

 Church of Euthanasia
 Church of the Flying Spaghetti Monster (a.k.a. "Pastafarianism")
 Church of the SubGenius
 Dinkoism
 Discordianism
 Dudeism
 Earthseed
 Terasem
 Iglesia Maradoniana
 Jediism
 Kibology
 Kopimism
 Landover Baptist Church
 Last Thursdayism
 The Nine Divines
 'Pataphysics
 Sisters of Perpetual Indulgence
 United Church of Bacon

Post-theistic and naturalistic religions 

Abrahamites
Cult of Reason
Cult of the Supreme Being
Deism
Christian Deism
Ethical movement
Freethought
North Texas Church of Freethought
God-Building
Humanism
Ietsism
Moorish Orthodox Church of America
Pandeism
Pantheism
Naturalistic pantheism
Religion of Humanity
Church of Humanity
Saint-Simonianism
Syntheism
Theophilanthropy
Unitarian Universalism
Universal Life Church

UFO religions 

Aetherius Society
Ashtar Galactic Command
Chen Tao ("True Way")
Fiat Lux
Ground Crew Project
Heaven's Gate
Industrial Church of the New World Comforter
Mark-Age
Nuwaubian Nation
Order of the Solar Temple
Raëlism
Scientology
Independent Scientology
The Seekers
Unarius Academy of Science
Universe people
Urantia movement

Western esotericism 

Anthroposophy
Archeosophical Society
Builders of the Adytum
Fourth Way
Fraternity of the Inner Light
Hermeticism
Hermetic Order of the Golden Dawn
The Hermetic Order of the Golden Dawn, Inc.
Illuminates of Thanateros
Luciferianism
Fraternitas Saturni
Neo-Luciferian Church
New Acropolis
Occultism
Gaianism
Mayanism
Michael Teachings
Ordo Aurum Solis
Otherkin
Rosicrucian
Ancient Mystical Order Rosae Crucis
Lectorium Rosicrucianum
Rosicrucian Fellowship
Satanism
Non-theistic Satanism
LaVeyan Satanism
Church of Satan
First Satanic Church
The Satanic Temple
Theistic Satanism
Joy of Satan
Order of Nine Angles
Our Lady of Endor Coven (Historical)
Temple of the Black Light
Temple of Set
Spiritualism
Faithism
Thelema
A∴A∴
Ordo Templi Orientis
Typhonian Order
Theosophy
Neo-Theosophy
Angi Yoga
Roerichism
Thee Temple ov Psychick Youth

Historical religions

Prehistoric Religion 

 Cucuteni–Trypillia religion
 Funnelbeaker religion
 Hemudu religion
 Hongshan religion
 Linear Pottery religion
 Paleolithic religion
 Urreligion (theorized)
 Urmonotheismus (theorized)
 Varna religion

Bronze Age 
 Ancient Egyptian religion
 Atenism
 Ancient Mesopotamian religion
 Babylonian Religion
 Sumerian religion
Ancient Semitic religion
 Ancient Canaanite religion
 Yahwism
Harappan religion
Hittite religion
Hurrian religion
 Liangzhu religion
 Longshan religion
Luwian religion
Minoan religion
Mycenaean religion
 Nordic Bronze Age religion
Proto-Indo-European religion
 Paleo-Balkan religion
 Proto-Indo-Iranian religion
Proto-Uralic religion
 Shang religion
 Urnfield religion

Classical antiquity 
 Adena religion
 Aksumite religion
 Albanian folk beliefs
 Proto-Celtic paganism
 Ancient Celtic religion
 Breton paganism
 Cornish paganism
 Irish paganism
 Manx paganism
 Scottish paganism
 Welsh paganism
 Ancient Greek religion
 Greco-Buddhism
 Greco-Roman mysteries
 Cult of the Great Gods
 Dionysian mysteries
 Orphism
 Eleusinian mysteries
 Mysteries of Isis
 Hellenistic religion
 Hermeticism
 Neoplatonism
 Pythagoreanism
 Neopythagoreanism
 Stoicism
 Ancient Iranian religion
 Armenian paganism
 Basque paganism
 Cantabrian religion
 Castro religion
 Dacian religion
 Elamite religion
 Etruscan religion
 Gallaecian religion
 Georgian paganism
 Germanic paganism
 Anglo-Saxon paganism
 Continental Germanic paganism
 Frankish paganism
 Old Norse religion
 Gothic paganism
 Iberian religion
 Illyrian religion
 Ligurian religion
 Lusitanian religion
 Lydian religion
 Nuragic religion
 Punic religion
 Religion in ancient Rome
 Gallo-Roman religion
 Imperial cult
 Greco-Roman mysteries
 Mithraism
 Religion in pre-Islamic Arabia
 Scythian religion
 Sramana
 Thracian religion
 Urartu religion
 Vedicism

Medieval Period 

 Balinese religion
 Baltic paganism
Prussian paganism
Latvian paganism
Lithuanian paganism
 Batak religion
 Bulgar religion
 Caucasian Albanian paganism
 Chimor religion
 Estonian shamanism
 Finnish shamanism
 Guanche religion
 Hungarian shamanism
 Khitan religion
 Jamaican Maroon religion
 Lima religion
 Moche religion
 Sámi shamanism
 Slavic paganism
 Tiwanaku religion
 Tocharian religion
 Vainakh religion
 Wari religion

Other categorisations

By demographics 

 List of religious populations

By area 

Religion in Africa
 Religion in Asia
 Religion in Oceania
 Religion in Europe
 Religion in North America
 Religion in South America
 Religion by country
 List of state-established religions
 Buddhism by country
 Buddhism in the United States
 Christianity by country
 Roman Catholicism by country
 Eastern Orthodoxy by country
 Protestantism by country
 Oriental Orthodoxy by country
 Hinduism by country
 Islam by country
 Ahmadiyya by country
 Judaism by country, Jewish population by country
 Sikhism by country

See also 
 Alchemy
 Ceremonial magic
 Chaos magic
 Civil religion
 Enochian magic
 Goetia
 Juche
 List of Catholic rites and churches
 List of mythologies
 List of pantheons
 Lists of people by belief
 List of religious organizations
 Magic
 Mythology
 Religious fundamentalism
 Witchcraft

References

Sources 
 </ref>

External links 

 Patheos World Religions library
 Statistics on religious belief or adherence
 BBC.co.uk section on major world religions

Religion-related lists
 
 
Dynamic lists